The 1972 Dwars door België was the 27th edition of the Dwars door Vlaanderen cycle race and was held on 27 August 1972. The race started and finished in Waregem. The race was won by Marc Demeyer.

General classification

References

1972
1972 in road cycling
1972 in Belgian sport